Skrīveri is a village in Aizkraukle Municipality in the Vidzeme region of Latvia, near Riga–Daugavpils Railway. Skrīveri had 2,879 residents in 2006. 

In Skrīveri there is a Municipal council, Andrejs Upītis Skrīveri Secondary School, music and art school, kindergarten "Sprīdītis", post office, Catholic church, culture house, library, Andrejs Upīts memorial museum.

History 
The settlement is located on the land of the former  Römerhof estate, which Gotthard Kettler had given a certain Stephan Römer. This is how the name  came about.

When the  Römershof  train station was opened in 1882  village Skrīveri began to develop. 

Since 1892 at the latest, the estate has belonged to the Livonian dendrologist  (1857–1919), who together with the garden architect   Walter von Engelhardt founded a tree nursery and an Arboretum. During the  1905 Russian Revolution the Manor house was destroyed. 

In 1925, Skriveri was granted village status, and in 1958 urban village, status which was lost in 1990.

In 1956, Skriveri Food Factory was founded, which started producing the favorite candy "Gotiņa".

Geography 
In the municipality of Skrīveri there is Daugava tributary  and tributary  which also includes a 10 hectare reservoir. Along the right bank of the river, there is a 3.6 km long tourist trail.

See also 
 Skrīveri Station

People 
 
 
 Andrejs Upīts

References 

Towns and villages in Latvia
Aizkraukle Municipality
Vidzeme